Creole Connections is a 1986 Canadian documentary film produced by Montreal's InformAction, profiling the Creole language and culture in the Lesser Antilles.  Its title comes from a song by Martinique singer Dédé Saint Prix.  The film was shot in 1984 across four territories: Dominica, Guadeloupe, Martinique and Saint Lucia.

See also
Canadian films of the 1980s

References

1986 documentary films
1986 films
Canadian documentary films
Caribbean culture
Films set in Dominica
Films set in Guadeloupe
Films set in Martinique
Films set in Saint Lucia
Films shot in Dominica
Films shot in Guadeloupe
Films shot in Martinique
Films shot in Saint Lucia
French-based pidgins and creoles
Canadian independent films
Films set in the Caribbean
Quebec films
French-language Canadian films
1980s Canadian films